Esther Wanjiru Maina (born March 27, 1977) is a retired female long-distance runner from Kenya.

She is from Kahuhia, Murang'a District.

On January 15, 1999 she finished second at a half marathon race in Tokyo. The race was won by Elana Meyer, who set a world record, while Wanjiru scored did also beat the previous world record by timing 1:06:49 

She won the Sendai Half Marathon in 1998 and 1999, and finished second in 2000.

She finished third at the 2000 Osaka Ladies Marathon, setting her personal best of 2:23:31 hours.

Wanjiru became the first Kenyan woman to win Commonwealth Games gold medal, although Jackline Maranga won 1500 metres later at the same games.

Achievements

She also competed in the marathon at the 2002 Commonwealth Games in Manchester.
She pulled out of the race whilst leading.

Trivia 
 Wanjiru made a cameo in the 2000 Japanese movie "Pinch Runner" as herself.

References 

 
trackfield.brinkster

1977 births
Kenyan female long-distance runners
Athletes (track and field) at the 1998 Commonwealth Games
Athletes (track and field) at the 2002 Commonwealth Games
Athletes (track and field) at the 2000 Summer Olympics
Olympic athletes of Kenya
Commonwealth Games gold medallists for Kenya
Commonwealth Games medallists in athletics
Living people
Medallists at the 1998 Commonwealth Games